Krishnagar Government College, established in 1846, is the oldest college in Nadia district in the Indian state of West Bengal. It offers undergraduate courses in arts and sciences and also some postgraduate courses. At first, the college was under the affiliation of University of Calcutta. Presently, it is affiliated to University of Kalyani (KU), National Assessment and Accreditation Council (NAAC) and University Grant Commission (UGC).

History 
Krishnagar Government College is the oldest college of the district. In 1846 Lord Hardinge approved the establishment proposal of the college. Nadia Raj Srishchandra Roy and Maharani Swarnamoyee Devi from Cossimbazar estate donated the land for it. The palatial building was made in 1856. The first principal was David Lester Richardson, famous educationist, ex-principal of the Presidency College, Calcutta. After that Marcus Gustavus Rochfort, Loper Lethbridge, Umesh Chandra Dutta, Jyoti Bhusan Bhadury, R.N Gilcriest, Eagerton Smith, Rakhalraj Biswas, and Satish Chandra De glorified the post. Notable personalities of the national freedom struggle, activists of political and social movements, academicians, and intellectuals came out from the college. Ramtanu Lahiri, Md. Abdul Hai, Bishnu Dey, Subodh Chandra Sengupta, Khudiram Das, Sudhir Chakravarti were among the notable faculty members of the college.

Academics
Krishnagar Government College offers three-year undergraduate courses in the field of arts and science along with honours; and two year post graduation courses. The college has 16 academic departments offering 19 major programs.

Accreditation
Krishnagar Government College was awarded an A (CGPA: 3.17, 2015) grade by the National Assessment and Accreditation Council (NAAC). The college is recognized by the University Grants Commission (UGC). The college was also named a "college with potential for excellence" in 2010. The college also has a long list of alumni members.

Notable alumni

See also

References

External links
Krishnagar Government College
University of Kalyani
University Grants Commission
National Assessment and Accreditation Council

Colleges affiliated to University of Kalyani
Educational institutions established in 1846
Universities and colleges in Nadia district
1846 establishments in British India
Government colleges in West Bengal
Krishnanagar